Okolona, also known as the R. T. Cochran House, is a historic home located near Middletown, New Castle County, Delaware.  It was built in 1866, and is a three-story, Italianate-style dwelling.  It sits on a stone foundation and has a low hipped roof.  It features an open tetra-style porch or verandah finished with open sawnwork trim and squared columns, and cornice brackets.

It was listed on the National Register of Historic Places in 1985.

References

Houses on the National Register of Historic Places in Delaware
Italianate architecture in Delaware
Houses completed in 1866
Houses in New Castle County, Delaware
1866 establishments in Delaware
National Register of Historic Places in New Castle County, Delaware